Darren Carr (born 4 September 1968) is an English retired football defender. In the 1996–97 season, he was part of Chesterfield's historic run to the FA Cup semi final, coming on as a substitute in both the semi final and semi final replay against Middlesbrough.

References

Unofficial Darren Carr Profile at The Forgotten Imp

1968 births
Living people
English footballers
Bristol Rovers F.C. players
Newport County A.F.C. players
Sheffield United F.C. players
Crewe Alexandra F.C. players
Chesterfield F.C. players
Gillingham F.C. players
Brighton & Hove Albion F.C. players
Rotherham United F.C. players
Lincoln City F.C. players
Carlisle United F.C. players
Dover Athletic F.C. players
Rushden & Diamonds F.C. players
Bath City F.C. players
Footballers from Bristol
Association football defenders